The 2008 Atlanta tornado outbreak was a destructive and deadly tornado outbreak that affected the Southeastern United States on March 14–15, 2008. The most infamous tornado of the outbreak occurred on March 14 when an isolated but strong EF2 tornado caused widespread damage across Downtown Atlanta, Georgia, including to the CNN Center and to the Georgia Dome, which was hosting the 2008 SEC men's basketball tournament. Other buildings that were damaged include the Georgia World Congress Center, Phillips Arena (now State Farm Arena) during an Atlanta Hawks game, and the Omni Hotel, which was evacuated after many windows were blown out. The Westin Peachtree Plaza Hotel suffered major window damage. The image of the building with all its windows blown out became famous and for a time was a symbol of the tornado. Centennial Olympic Park, SunTrust Plaza (now Truist Plaza) and historic Oakland Cemetery were also damaged.

One man was killed near Downtown Atlanta and 30 others were injured. Two other deaths took place on March 15, in the northern Atlanta suburbs, from a second, larger round of severe weather and tornadoes. In total, 46 tornadoes were confirmed over the 24-hour period, from eastern Alabama to the Carolina coast, with most of the activity concentrated in the Metropolitan Atlanta area, the Central Savannah River Area and the Midlands of South Carolina.

Meteorological synopsis

Atlanta tornado event 

In their 9:00 pm EDT outlook, the Storm Prediction Center issued a slight risk of severe weather across portions of the southern United States from Oklahoma to Georgia, with a 2% risk area for tornadoes for the Atlanta area. The tornado moved to the southeast, which is unusual as most supercells have a strong northward component along (or ahead of) a cold front. It also was unusual because it was not associated with such a squall line at all, but was an independent supercell well ahead of the main storm system.

March 15 tornado event 

Another tornado outbreak struck the southeast the following day. A moderate risk for severe storms was issued early in the morning, and maintained through the afternoon. However, by mid afternoon, areas of east-central Georgia and central South Carolina were upgraded to a high risk of severe storms due to the tornado threat.

Confirmed tornadoes

March 14 event

March 15 event

Atlanta, Georgia

CNN Center was severely damaged, including shattered windows. The Georgia World Congress Center also sustained serious damage, as was the Omni Hotel, especially the skywalk between the two hotel towers over Andrew Young International Boulevard. This complex alone lost 476 windows, making it necessary to close the south tower to guests. The facades of the Georgia Dome and a Philips Arena parking garage were damaged while hosting basketball games.
 

Two of the giant columns in Centennial Olympic Park were knocked down, and insulation was stuck in trees. Trees on some other streets were blown completely down, despite being too early in spring to involve leaf drag. Glass was strewn across several streets, and Atlanta Police kept residents, hotel guests, and news crews away from buildings with falling glass, which continued to pose a danger into the night. Cars in the area were also damaged, and hotel and office furniture was found scattered about.
 

The Ritz Carlton, Westin Peachtree Plaza, Georgia-Pacific Building, SunTrust Plaza (where more than 60 people had to be relocated out of their offices), Equitable Building, and Georgia State University also had windows blown out (300 at Equitable alone), as did The Tabernacle (a former church with stained glass that is now a concert venue). The windows of the Westin continued to fall for days after the tornado, forcing police to keep several city blocks and MARTA's Peachtree Center station closed to pedestrians. The Georgia World Congress Center also sustained flooding while hosting a JROTC event and the Hinman Dental Meeting; Fox Sports Net took footage of a staircase in the new section of the complex that looked like a fountain with water cascading down it. The annual Atlanta Home Show and all other events were cancelled for the weekend in the GWCC complex, as was the Atlanta St. Patrick's Day Parade scheduled for the next day. WRAS FM at Georgia State University was off the air for two days, though it was not stated whether its studio or tower sustained damage, or if this was due to security or safety concerns, or power outages. The historic Rialto Theatre at GSU also sustained roof damage, which caused water damage inside.
 

Further east, Grady Hospital reported some damage to windows and a power outage. Many of the injured were taken there, and some walked there and were treated in the emergency room for cuts due to glass. The King Memorial MARTA station was damaged and was being bypassed by trains, with buses rerouted to the next station on each side. Oakland Cemetery suffered major damage to monuments and to its huge oaks and magnolias, and the caretaker found window blinds around the neck of a statue of a Civil War veteran buried there.
 

In the nearby Cabbagetown area, a brick loft building (well known for the fire that occurred there in 1999, during its renovation from the Fulton Bag and Cotton Mills, in which the crane operator was rescued by helicopter during live TV news coverage) lost part of its roof, and part of the top (fifth) floor. Another building at The Stacks on Boulevard was damaged; search and rescue personnel were unable to enter, but everyone was accounted for by the management within a few hours.
 

When the tornado hit, a SEC tournament game between Mississippi State and Alabama which had just been sent into overtime minutes earlier by a shot from Mykal Riley, was in progress at the Georgia Dome and being broadcast live on television. The storm ripped panels from the exterior of the building and tore two holes in the roof of the Dome, causing insulation to fall and the scoreboard and catwalks suspended from the roof to sway; much of this was captured on camera, though the transmission from the arena was interrupted. Riley's shot was considered to have saved lives by keeping people safe inside the Georgia Dome. After a 64-minute delay, the game was completed, however the next scheduled game between Kentucky and Georgia was postponed.  The remainder of the tournament games were played at Alexander Memorial Coliseum on the campus of Georgia Tech, with spectators restricted to team and conference personnel, media, team bands, and families of players only due to the much smaller size of the alternate venue. At the nearby Philips Arena, little disruption was noticed by the attendees during the game between the Hawks and the Los Angeles Clippers, even though damage occurred to the outside of the arena.
 
Twenty-seven people were treated for injuries. In addition, over 20 homes were completely destroyed.
 
All of CNN's TV networks remained on the air, but there was damage to the glass roof of the CNN Center atrium, flooding part of the food court. Additionally, blown-out windows in the ground floor CNN.com newsroom and the fourth floor videotape library caused minor damage. Live news coverage of the aftermath was carried on CNN International, in turn simulcast domestically on CNN until 1 am EDT. CNN resumed broadcasting from their main newsroom at 6 am EDT, showing several parts of the newsroom with computer stations covered with tarps, the damaged atrium of CNN Center, and staff using trash cans and buckets to collect dripping rainwater to the right of the anchor desk due to the damaged roof. When more storms moved in later in the day, the network was forced to move all Atlanta on-camera operations to the windowless CNN-I studio, while taped programming was shown for most of the day.
 
The city received emergency assistance from the Georgia Emergency Management Agency (GEMA), Highway Emergency Response Operators (HEROs), Fulton and DeKalb counties (where Atlanta is situated), and surrounding cities and counties. Atlanta Mayor Shirley Franklin also declared a state of emergency for the city  and Governor Sonny Perdue issued a state state of emergency declaration  for Atlanta enabling the city to seek disaster aid from the Federal Emergency Management Agency (FEMA). President Bush declared a major disaster on March 20.
 
At the time, it was the most expensive tornado in American history, in raw U.S. dollars, after the 1999 Oklahoma City tornado, costing a half-billion dollars.

See also 
 List of North American tornadoes and tornado outbreaks
 List of tornadoes striking downtown areas

Footnotes

References

External links 
 Possible Tornado Sweeps Through Atlanta - CNN Breaking News Transcript - March 14, 2008
 WSB's coverage of the tornado
 WXIA's coverage of the tornado
 WAGA's coverage of the tornado
 WGCL's coverage of the tornado

F3 tornadoes
Tornadoes of 2008
Tornadoes in Georgia (U.S. state)
2008 natural disasters in the United States
Atlanta metropolitan area disasters
2008 in Atlanta
March 2008 events in the United States